Waialua High and Intermediate School is a public intermediate and high school for grades 7–12 in the Waialua CDP in City and County of Honolulu, Hawaii on the Island of Oahu.

The campus boasts the painted plastic mural A Waialua Day by Balazs Szabo and the mixed media sculpture Waialua from Ken Shutt's Konohiki Series.

History 
The school was founded in 1914 as a single-roomed school called Mokuleia School. In 1927 Andrew E. Cox donated  tracts of land for the school's campus, and it was renamed Andrew E. Cox Junior High School. In 1937 the school was enlarged to include a senior high school and was renamed to its present name.

References

External links
 
 Public School Review Profile

Public middle schools in Honolulu County, Hawaii
Public high schools in Honolulu County, Hawaii
Educational institutions established in 1914
1914 establishments in Hawaii